Waldemar Krzystek (born 23 November 1953) is a Polish film director and screenwriter. His film Ostatni prom was screened in the Un Certain Regard section at the 1990 Cannes Film Festival. 

His 2008 cold war romance Little Moscow (Mała Moskwa), won him a Golden Lion at the XXXIII annual Polish Film Festival. His 2011 film 80 Million was selected as the Polish entry for the Best Foreign Language Oscar at the 85th Academy Awards, but it did not make the final shortlist.

Filmography
 Powinowactwo (1984)
 W zawieszeniu (1987)
 Ostatni prom (1989)
 Zwolnieni z zycia (1992)
 Polska smierc (1995)
 Nie ma zmiluj (2000)
 Mała Moskwa (2008)
 80 Million (2011)
 Fotograf  (2014)

References

External links
 

1953 births
Living people
Polish film directors
Polish screenwriters
People from Gryfino County